Victor Regalado (born 15 April 1948) is a Mexican professional golfer who played on the PGA Tour.

Early life 
Regalado was born and raised in Tijuana, Mexico.

Amateur career 
As an amateur, he played in tournaments in the San Diego, California area just across the border from his home. He represented Mexico twice in the amateur worlds, the Eisenhower Trophy. In 1970 in Madrid, Spain, finished on top of the individual competition, two strokes ahead of Dale Hayes, South Africa, and the Mexican team finished fifth.

Professional career 
Regaldo turned professional in 1971. He had just over 30 top-10 finishes in PGA Tour events including two wins. His first win came at the 1974 Pleasant Valley Classic. His second win came at a tournament in which he enjoyed a great deal of career success: the Ed McMahon-Jaycees Quad Cities Open. He won there in 1978, after finishing runner-up the year before. He also finished runner-up in 1981 when he lost to Dave Barr in a sudden death playoff. His best finish in a major was T10 at the 1984 PGA Championship.

Regalado is currently one of only four native Mexican golfers to win on the PGA Tour, alongside Cesar Sanudo, Carlos Ortiz, and Abraham Ancer.

Personal life 
Regaldo currently lives in San Diego.

Amateur wins
1967 San Diego Men's Amateur Open
1970 San Diego Men's Amateur Open

Professional wins (7)

PGA Tour wins (2)

PGA Tour playoff record (0–1)

Other wins (5)
1971 Mexican Masters
1972 Mexican Masters, Utah Open, Treasure Valley Open (Boise, Idaho)
1973 Mexican PGA Championship

Results in major championships

Note: Regalado never played in The Open Championship.

CUT = missed the half-way cut
"T" = tied

Team appearances
Amateur
Eisenhower Trophy (representing Mexico): 1968, 1970 (individual leader)

Professional
World Cup (representing Mexico): 1972, 1973, 1978, 1979, 1982, 1983

See also 

 1972 PGA Tour Qualifying School graduates

References

External links

Mexican male golfers
PGA Tour golfers
People from Tijuana
Sportspeople from Baja California
Golfers from San Diego
1948 births
Living people
20th-century Mexican people